Velika Jasikova is a village in the municipality of Zaječar, Serbia. According to the 2011 census, the village has a population of 802 people.

Dominant ethnic group: Serbs 48.4% and Vlachs 35.6%.

There are Roman ruins at the outskirts of the village and the foundations of a Mediaeval church in the fields surrounding the village.

References

Populated places in Zaječar District